Kilis Museum is a museum in Kilis, Turkey

Location
The museum is in Kilis, one of the recent province centers of Turkey. It is on Nemika street at

History
The museum is situated in a mansion named Neşet Efendi Konağı. The mansion was built in 1927. In 1979 the Ministry of Culture purchased the building. Between 1986-2008 it was the Kilis Public Library. On 20 June 2012 it was opened as the museum of Kilis.

Exhibited items
Kilis is situated in an area rich in archaeologic finds.
 The ground floor of the museum is the archaeology section. In the first room paleolithic and neolithic finds are exhibited. The second room is reserved for the early Bronze Age and the third room is reserved for the mid Bronze Age. Late Bronze Age, Iron Age, Hellenistic, Roman and  Byzantine items are in the main hall.

The upper floor is the ethnography section. Among the six rooms one room is the guest room of the Kilis citizens with classical furniture and mannequins representing three generations. One room is the bedroom and another one is the kitchen with its copper cockware.

References

Buildings and structures in Kilis Province
2009 establishments in Turkey
Museums in Turkey
Tourist attractions in Kilis Province
Museums established in 2012